Five Little Indians , (also known as FLI) was an alternative rock band based in Kolkata. The band was formed in January 2007. Five Little Indians merged melodic rock and a heavier sound with singer-songwriter sensibilities. The band used Hindustani classical vocals and often mixed ragas with a rock sound.

History
Five Little Indians played its debut show at the Eastwind Festival '08. The band had formed only a few months before.

Back at Kolkata, the band was featured in The Times of India for its original sound. Simultaneously, FLI was the band in focus for August 2008 on IndianMusicRevolution.
The band played the Calcutta leg of the RSJ Pubrockfest '08, taking the stage after Aurora Jane to a full house at Someplace Else. The band played at Star Theatre, Calcutta as part of INTERface '08, an inter-disciplinary arts festival featuring artistes from Korea, Singapore, Switzerland and Japan.

The November issue of Rolling Stone magazine, India, featured FLI's first single, "Happy Birthday" on its Downloads section, lauding the band's dark, moody sound and offering up a 3½ rating for the song.

In early 2009, FLI co-headlined the east zone finals of Campus Rock Idols with Skinny Alley in January. In May, the band, along with Bertie Da Silva and The Supersonics, organised the first chapter of Elektrik Kool Rock Revue, a platform for all-original music showcased in a series of shows. FLI also opened for French chanson-rockers KWAK and was featured as part Littlei's Friday Night Live series at the Big Ben, The Kenilworth. Apart from the 2008 and 2009 editions of the RSJ/Kingfisher Pubrockfest, the band headlined the Autumn Festival 2009 at Shillong and then headlined the Hornbill Festival in Kisama, Kohima. In February 2010, the FLI opened for pop singer Richard Marx at Rock'N'India, Bangalore, along with Swarathma, Jaycee Lewis and Prime Circle from South Africa. FLI also played the Greenpeace Earth Day Fest in May 2010. 

In between live performances, Five Little Indians also crafted the soundtrack to Gandu, the critically acclaimed 2010 feature by Kolkata-based director Q. The independent film went on to bag several awards at the South Asian International Film Festival 2010 at New York.   
Five Little Indians disbanded in 2011.

Members
 Neel Adhikari: vocals, guitar
 Allan Temjen Ao: guitar, backing vocals
 Arka Das: drums/percussion
 Sayak Banerjee: vocals, guitar
 Roheet Mukherjee: bass guitar, vocals

Former members

Sandip Roy: bass, backing vocals
Rabi L. Roy: bass, backing vocals
Sanket Bhattacharya: bass guitar, vocals

References

External links
Official Five Little Indians website
Interview with FLI
Five Little Indians score Gandu soundtrack
 Netherworld
 In Shades of Grey

Musical groups established in 2007
Indian alternative rock groups
Musical groups disestablished in 2011
Bengali musical groups